8K resolution refers to an image or display resolution with a width of approximately 8,000 pixels. 8K UHD is the highest resolution defined in the Rec. 2020 (UHDTV) standard.

8K display resolution is the successor to 4K resolution. TV manufacturers pushed to make 4K a new standard by 2017. At CES 2019, the first 8K TVs were unveiled. The feasibility of a fast transition to this new standard is questionable in view of the absence of broadcasting resources. It is predicted (2018 forecast by Strategy Analytics) that 8K-ready devices will still only account for 3% of UHD TVs by 2023 with global sales of 11 million units a year. However, TV manufacturers remain optimistic as the 4K market grew much faster than expected, with actual sales exceeding projections nearly six-fold in 2016.

In 2013, a transmission network's capability to carry HDTV resolution was limited by internet speeds and relied on satellite broadcast to transmit the high data rates. The demand is expected to drive the adoption of video compression standards and to place significant pressure on physical communication networks in the near future.

, few cameras had the capability to shoot video in 8K, NHK being one of the few companies to have created a small broadcasting camera with an 8K image sensor. By 2018, Red Digital Cinema camera company had delivered three 8K cameras in both a Full Frame sensor and Super 35 sensor. Until major content sources are available, 8K is speculated to become a mainstream consumer display resolution around 2023 as mentioned in UHD forum Phase-B recommendations. Despite this,
filmmakers are pushing demand for 8K cameras due to their ability to capture better 4K footage.

8K standards and technology 
The term "8K" is generic and refers to any resolution with a horizontal pixel count of approximately 8,000. Several different 8K resolutions have been standardized by various organizations.

History 

Japan's public broadcaster NHK was the first to start research and development of 4320p resolution in 1995. The format was standardized by SMPTE in October 2007, Interface standardized by SMPTE in August 2010 and recommended as the international standard for television by lTU-R in 2012. Followed by public displays at electronics shows and screenings of 2014 Winter Olympics in Sochi and public viewings in February 2014 and the FIFA World Cup in Brazil in June 2014 using HEVC with partners AstroDesign and Ikegami Electronics.

On January 6, 2015, the MHL Consortium announced the release of the superMHL specification which will support 8K resolution at 120fps, 48-bit video, the Rec. 2020 color space, high dynamic range support, a 32-pin reversible superMHL connector, and power charging of up to 40 watts.

On March 1, 2016, The Video Electronics Standards Association (VESA) unveiled DisplayPort 1.4, a new format that allows the use of 8K resolution at 60Hz with HDRR and 32 audio channels through USB-C.

On January 4, 2017, the HDMI Forum announced HDMI 2.1 featuring support for 8K video with HDR, will be "released early in Q2 2017".

8K Association Formed at CES 2019 to Help Develop 8K Ecosystem.

In early February 2020, Samsung Electronics announced during their Unpacked event that their Samsung Galaxy S20 can video record in 8K, which uses 600MB of storage per minute.

First cameras 
On April 6, 2013, Astrodesign Inc. announced the AH-4800, capable of recording 8K resolution.
In April 2015, it was announced by Red that their newly unveiled Red Weapon VV is also capable of recording 8K footage.
In October 2016, they announced two additional 8K cameras, Red Weapon 8K S35 and Red Epic-W 8K S35. The Red Weapon Dragon VV has been discontinued , when Red unveiled the Red Weapon Monstro VV, their fourth camera capable of shooting 8K, with additional improvements in dynamic range and noise reduction, among other features.

Mobile phone cameras 
In May 2019, mobile phone vendors started releasing the first mobile phones with 8K video recording capabilities, such as the ZTE Nubia Red Magic 3 series.

This is enabled by the sufficient resolution of image sensors used in mobile phones, and by the sufficient chipset performance. However, mobile phones with up to 5K (2880p) or 6K (3240p) video cameras have never been released.
 Asus ZenFone 7
 Redmi K30 Pro
 Redmi K40
 ROG Phone 3
 Vivo X50
 Vivo X60
 LG V60 ThinQ
 Nubia Z20
 Samsung Galaxy Note 20
 Samsung Galaxy S20
 Samsung Galaxy S21
 Samsung Galaxy S22
 Samsung Galaxy S23
 Xiaomi Mi 10
 Xiaomi Mi 10 Ultra
 Xiaomi Mi 10T
 Xiaomi Mi 11

Productions 
In 2007, the original 65mm negative of the 1992 film Baraka was re-scanned at 8K with a film scanner built specifically for the job at FotoKem Laboratories, and used to remaster the 2008 Blu-ray release. Chicago Sun-Times critic Roger Ebert described the Blu-ray release as "the finest video disc I have ever viewed or ever imagined." A similar 8K scan/4K intermediate digital restoration of Lawrence of Arabia was made for Blu-ray and theatrical re-release during 2012 by Sony Pictures to celebrate the film's 50th anniversary. According to Grover Crisp, executive VP of restoration at Sony Pictures, the new 8K scan has such high resolution that when examined, showed a series of fine concentric lines in a pattern "reminiscent of a fingerprint" near the top of the frame. This was caused by the film emulsion melting and cracking in the desert heat during production. Sony had to hire a third party to minimize or eliminate the rippling artifacts in the new restored version.

On May 17, 2013, the Franklin Institute premiered To Space and Back, an 8K×8K, 60fps, 3D video running approximately 25 minutes. During its first run at the Fels Planetarium it was played at 4K, 60 fps.

In November 2013, NHK screened the experimental-drama short film "The Chorus" at Tokyo Film Festival which was filmed in 8K and 22.2 sound format.

On May 1, 2015, an 8K abstract computer animation was screened at the Filmatic Festival at the University of California, San Diego. The work was created as an assignment in the VIS 40/ICAM 40 Introduction to Computing in the Arts class taught at UCSD by Associate Teaching Professor Brett Stalbaum during the winter quarter of 2015, with each student producing three hundred  pixel frames. The work's music soundtrack was composed by Mark Matamoros.

On January 6, 2016, director James Gunn stated that the 2017 film Guardians of the Galaxy Vol. 2 would be the first feature film to be shot in 8K, using the Red Weapon 8K VV.

Broadcasting 
Japanese public broadcaster NHK began research and development on 8K in 1995, having spent over $1 billion on R&D since then. Codenamed Super Hi-Vision (named after its old Hi-Vision analog HDTV system), NHK also was simultaneously working on the development of 22.2 channel surround sound audio. The world's first 8K television was unveiled by Sharp at the Consumer Electronics Show (CES) in 2012. Experimental transmissions of the resolution were tested with the 2012 Summer Olympics, and at the Cannes Film Festival showcasing Beauties À La Carte, a 27-minute short showcased publicly on a 220" screen, with a three-year roadmap that entails the launch of 8K test broadcasting in 2016, with plans to roll out full 8K services by 2018, and in time for the 2020 Summer Olympics, which were delayed to 2021 due to the COVID-19 pandemic. On December 1, 2018, NHK launched BS8K, a broadcast channel transmitting at 8K resolution.

On February 28, 2020, it was reported that BT Sport would broadcast the UEFA Europa League in 8K HDR10+ as early as August 2020.

Gaming 
Sony announced that the PlayStation 5 will support 8K graphics.
Microsoft then announced Xbox Series X with 8K graphic support, released in November 2020. Nvidia's GeForce RTX 3090 promises to enable 8K 60fps HDR gaming, recording, and streaming with ShadowPlay on PCs.

Editing 
Given adequate hardware, 8K video can be edited by all major non-linear video editors such as Avid Media Composer, Adobe Premiere Pro, Lightworks, Vegas Pro, Final Cut Pro X, Edius, DaVinci Resolve, and Kdenlive.

Resolutions

This is the resolution of the UHDTV2 format defined in SMPTE ST 2036–1, as well as the 8K UHDTV format defined in ITU-R BT.2020. It was also chosen by the DVB project as the resolution for their 8K broadcasting standard, UHD-2. It has 33.2 million total pixels, and is double the linear resolution of 4K UHD (four times as many total pixels), three times the linear resolution of 1440p (nine times as many total pixels), four times the linear resolution of 1080p (16 times as many total pixels), and six times the linear resolution of 720p (36 times as many total pixels).

Devices

TVs 
 Sharp's 85" 8K LCD TV,  resolution International Consumer Electronics Show (CES) 2012
 Panasonic's 145" 8K Plasma Display,  resolution Internationale Funkausstellung Berlin (IFA) 2012
 LG's 98" 8K LCD TV,  resolution Internationale Funkausstellung Berlin (IFA) 2014
 Panasonic's 55" 8K 120Hz LCD,  resolution International Consumer Electronics Show (CES) 2015
 Samsung's 110" 8K 3D LCD TV,  resolution International Consumer Electronics Show (CES) 2015
 BOE 98" 8K TV at CEATEC 2015
 LG's 98-inch UH9800 with ColorPrime Plus technology International Consumer Electronics Show (CES) 2016
 Samsung 98-inch SUHD 8K curved TV International Consumer Electronics Show (CES) 2016
 Hisense 98-inch ULED 8K TV International Consumer Electronics Show (CES) 2016
 Changhong 98-inch 98ZHQ2R "8K Super UHD",  resolution International Consumer Electronics Show (CES) 2016
 Samsung Q9S 85-inch QLED TV International Consumer Electronics Show (CES) 2018
 LG 88 inch 8K OLED TV International Consumer Electronics Show (CES) 2018
 Samsung Q900 R 65, 75, 82, and 85 inch 8K QLED TV models at CES 2019
 Sony Z9G/ZG9 85 inch and 100 inch 8K Ultra HD Bravia TV International Consumer Electronics Show (CES) 2019
 Sony Z8H/ZH8 75 and 85 inch 8K Ultra HD Bravia TV International Consumer Electronics Show (CES) 2020
Sony Z9J65, 75, 85, and 100 inch 8K Ultra HD Bravia International Consumer Electronics Show 2021 virtual event.
Sony Z9K65, 75, 85, and 100 inch 8K Ultra HD Bravia International Consumer Electronics Show 2022 hybrid event.
 TCL 75 inch 8K QLED TV FIBA Basketball World Cup 2019 Edition displayed at IFA 2018
 Hisense U9E 75 inch 8K QLED at IFA global press conference 2019
 Samsung QLED 8K TV Q700T/Q800T/Q950TS Samsung.com

Projectors 
 Digital Projection INSIGHT Laser 8K at Integrated Systems Europe 2018

Monitors 
 Canon 30" 8K reference display September 2015
 Sharp's prototype 27-inch 8K 120Hz IGZO desktop monitor with HDR (CEATEC 2016)
 Philips 328P8K 8K UHD desktop Monitor (ces 2017)
 Dell UltraSharp 32 Ultra HD 8K Monitor (UP3218K) (CES 2017)
 BOE 8K 13.3 inch Narrow Bezel Laptop Display at CITE 2018

8K VR Headset 
 Pimax Vision 8K X, made up of two  screens @ 90Hz, started Crowdfunding in October 2017, with the product released and shipped in September 2020.

Cameras 
 Astrodesign AH-4800, 1.7-inch CMOS camera capable of recording in 8K resolution. Unveiled by on April 6, 2013.
 RED Weapon Vista Vision 35MM 8K at 60fps in full-sensor mode, or up to 75fps in a scope frame format. The camera has a  sensor based on the previous generation Dragon sensor. Unveiled at NAB 2015, released end of 2015.
 RED DSMC2 Helium with an S35MM 8K  35.4 megapixel CMOS sensor—up to 60fps at 8K and 75 fps at 8K  with a dynamic range of 16.5+ stops; limited release July 2016, general release October 2016.
 RED Epic-W with an S35MM 8K  35.4 megapixel CMOS Helium sensor—up to 30fps at 8K with a dynamic range of 16.5+ stops; release date: October 2016.
 RED DSMC2 Monstro 8K VV  35.4 megapixel CMOS "wider than full frame" Monstro sensor—up to 60fps at 8K and 75fps at 8K  with a dynamic range of 17+ stops; release date: October 2017.
 Ikegami S35MM SHK-810 8K broadcast camera. Unveiled at NAB 2015.
 Hitachi S35MM SK-UHD8060 broadcast camera Unveiled at NAB 2015.
 Hitachi S35MM SK-UHD8000 broadcast camera. Production version of the SK-UHD8060.
 Canon Cinema EOS System S35MM 8K camera. Unveiled September, 2015.
 Panavision DXL 35MM 8K 60fps and HDR Digital Cinematography Camera (Vista Vision Sensor). May 2016
 Sharp S35MM 8C-B60A 8K Professional broadcast Camcorder Nov 2017
 Cinemartin Fran 8K VV Global Shutter, announced on May 8, 2018, starting sales in fall 2018. Company went to bankruptcy on April 1, 2019, and camera is no longer available. It never reached production stage, only prototype.
 Blackmagic URSA Mini Pro 12K, originally 110fps in 8K, since September 2020 firmware update up to 120fps for DCI, 16:9 and 6:5 Anamorphic aspect ratio modes and up to 160fps for 2.4:1 aspect ratio mode.
 Canon EOS R5 camera. Announced July 9, 2020.
 Sony Alpha 1 flagship mirrorless camera. Announced in San Diego, CA – January 26, 2021 – Sony Electronics
 Nikon Z 9 camera. Announced on October 28, 2021.
 Sony VENICE 2 camera (Full-Frame 8.6K image sensor) Announced November 15, 2021.

Action Cameras 
 Byroras CA100 shoots 8K @ 15fps, up to 40m underwater
 Nello X3K+ shoots 8K @ 15fps

Smartphones with 8K camera 

 Samsung Galaxy S20 series, shoots 8K @ 24fps, went on sale from February 2020
 Samsung Galaxy Note 20 series, shoots 8K @ 24fps, went on sale from August 2020
 Samsung Galaxy S21 series, shoots 8K @ 24fps, went on sale from January 2021
 Samsung Galaxy S22 series, shoots 8K @ 24fps, went on sale from February 2022
 Samsung Galaxy S23 series, shoots 8K @ 24fps, went on sale from February 2023
 Asus ROG Phone 3, shoots 8K @ 30fps, went on sale from July 2020
 Asus ROG Phone 5, shoots 8K @ 30fps, went on sale from April 2021
 Asus ZenFone 7, shoots 8K @ 30fps, went on sale from September 2020
 Asus ZenFone 8, shoots 8K @ 24fps, went on sale from May 2021
 Asus ZenFone 8 Flip, shoots 8K @ 30fps, went on sale from May 2021
 Lenovo Legion Duel 2, shoots 8K @ 24fps, went on sale from May 2021
 LG V60 ThinQ, shoots 8K @ 30fps, went on sale from March 2020
 Motorola Edge 20 Pro, shoots 8K @ 24fps, went on sale from August 2021
 OnePlus 9/9 Pro, shoots 8K @ 30fps, went on sale from March 2021
 Xiaomi Mi 10/Mi 10 Pro, shoots 8K @ 30fps, went on sale from February 2020
 Xiaomi Mi 10 Ultra, shoots 8K @ 24fps, went on sale from August 2020
 Xiaomi Mi 10T/Mi 10T Pro, shoots 8K @ 30fps, went on sale from October 2020
 Xiaomi Mi 11, shoots 8K @ 24/30fps, went on sale from January 2021
 Xiaomi Mi 11 Pro/Mi 11 Ultra, shoots 8K @ 24fps, went on sale from April 2021
 Xiaomi MIX 4, shoots 8K @ 24fps, went on sale from August 2021
 Redmi K30 Pro, Poco F2 Pro, shoots 8K @ 24/30fps, went on sale from March–May 2020
 Redmi K40 Pro/K40 Pro+, shoots 8K @ 30fps, went on sale from March 2021
 Sharp Aquos R5G, shoots 8K @ 30fps, went on sale from July 2020
 Vivo X50 Pro+, shoots 8K @ 30fps, went on sale from July 2020
 Vivo X60 Pro+, shoots 8K @ 30fps, went on sale from January 2021
 ZTE Axon 30 Ultra, shoots 8K @ 30fps, went on sale from April 2021
 ZTE Nubia Red Magic 3, shoots 8K @ 15fps, went on sale from May 2019
 ZTE Nubia Red Magic 3s, shoots 8K @ 15fps, went on sale from September 2019
 ZTE Nubia Red Magic 5G, shoots 8K @ 15fps, went on sale from March 2020
 ZTE Nubia Red Magic 5S, shoots 8K @ 30fps, went on sale from August 2020
 ZTE Nubia Red Magic 6/6 Pro, shoots 8K @ 30fps, went on sale from March 2021
 ZTE Nubia Red Magic 6R, shoots 8K @ 30fps, went on sale from June 2021
 ZTE Nubia Z20, shoots 8K @ 15fps, went on sale from August 2019
 ZTE Nubia Z30 Pro, shoots 8K @ 30fps, went on sale from May 2021

8K VR camera 
 QooCam 8K, first affordable 8K 360° VR camera, with built-in video stitching.
 Insta360 Pro 2

Fulldome 
 Definiti 8K theaters,  resolution (apu)

See also 
 2K resolution  digital video formats with a horizontal resolution of around 2,000 pixels
 4K resolution digital video formats with a horizontal resolution of around 4000 pixels
 5K resolution digital video formats with a horizontal resolution of around 5000 pixels, aimed at non-television computer monitor usage
 10K resolution digital video formats with a horizontal resolution of around 10,000 pixels, aimed at non-television computer monitor usage
 16K resolution digital video formats with a horizontal resolution of around 16,000 pixels
 32K resolution
 Ultra-high-definition television (UHDTV) digital video formats with resolutions of 4K and 8K
 Rec. 2020 ITU-R Recommendation for UHDTV
 Digital movie camera
 Digital cinematography makes extensive use of UHD video
 List of large sensor interchangeable-lens video cameras

References

External links 
 

Digital imaging
Film and video technology
Ultra-high-definition television